Céspedes is a Spanish patronymic surname, originating in Spain which is derived from the spanish césped, meaning "grass; fields." It would have likely denoted a farmer or gardener. It can refer to:

Alba de Céspedes, Cuban-Italian writer
Augusto Céspedes Patzi, Bolivian writer, journalist, politician, and diplomat, 
Carlos Manuel de Céspedes, Cuban independence fighter
Carlos Manuel de Céspedes y Quesada, Cuban writer, politician, diplomat, and President of Cuba
Eleno de Céspedes (1545-1588 or later), possible intersex person
Gonzalo de Céspedes y Meneses, Spanish novelist
Gregorious de Cespedes, Portuguese missionary
Jair Céspedes (born 1984), Peruvian soccer player 
Manuel Hilario de Céspedes y García Menocal (born 1944), a bishop of the Roman Catholic Diocese of Matanzas, Cuba
Pablo de Céspedes, Spanish painter, poet, and architect
Robert Cespedes (born 1954), Thai actor and singer
Vincent Cespedes (born 1973), French philosopher, writer and composer
Yoelqui Céspedes (born 1997), Cuban baseball player
Yoenis Céspedes (born 1985), Cuban baseball player